The Wise Kid is a lost 1922 American silent comedy film directed by Tod Browning.

Plot
As described in a film magazine, restaurant cashier Rosie Cooper (Walton) is in love with bakery worker Freddie Smith (Butler), but when she helps out customer Jefferson Southwick (Barrows), who has forgotten his pocketbook, Jimmie becomes jealous. Southwick poses as the son of a wealthy merchant, but when they discover his accounts are short, he borrows one hundred dollars from Rosie and then attempts to skip town. She is too smart for him, though, and he lands in jail. Rosie gets her money back and is content with the attentions of Freddie, who is honest even if he is poor.

Cast
 Gladys Walton as Rosie Cooper
 David Butler as Freddie Smith
 Hallam Cooley as Harry
 Hector Sarno as Tony Rossi
 Henry A. Barrows as Jefferson Southwick

See also
List of lost films

References

External links

1922 films
American silent feature films
American black-and-white films
Films directed by Tod Browning
Universal Pictures films
Silent American comedy films
Lost American films
1922 comedy films
1920s American films